"Simon Says" is a bubblegum pop song written by Elliot Chiprut and originally recorded in 1967 by the 1910 Fruitgum Company, becoming their most successful chart hit.

The song was based on the children's game "Simon Says".  Produced by Jerry Kasenetz, Jeffry Katz, and Chiprut, the single was issued by Buddah Records and entered the U.S. Hot 100 in January 1968, rising to #4 on the chart. It was also a hit in the UK, where it reached #2 on the singles chart.

It also was the title track on the first album by the 1910 Fruitgum Company.

In Italy the song was covered by the group Giuliano e i Notturni with the title "Il ballo di Simone", and charted #3 on the Italian hit parade. In 1968 French singer Claude François also had a major hit with it under the French title "Jacques a Dit". Children's entertainers Sharon, Lois & Bram covered it on their 1995 album ''Let's Dance!'. Also in 1968 it was covered by the Greek group The Idols with lyrics by Nikos Mastorakis, becoming their most successful song.

With lyrics by Uno Asplund, Flamingokvintetten recorded the song in Swedish as "Nynna en sång", and released it as a single in 1968, with "Hon är 16 år i dag" (Happy Birthday, Sweet Sixteen as B-side).

Chart history

Weekly charts
1910 Fruitgum Company

Dickie Rock & Miami

Year-end charts

References

1967 singles
1910 Fruitgum Company songs
Ohio Express songs
1967 songs
Buddah Records singles
RPM Top Singles number-one singles
Irish Singles Chart number-one singles
Number-one singles in South Africa
Flamingokvintetten songs